Kirk LaPointe (born December 12, 1957) is a Canadian journalist and politician.

Early life
LaPointe was born in Toronto, where he was raised by a single mother in what he describes as poverty conditions. He was educated at New Toronto Secondary School and Ryerson Polytechnical Institute, later known as Ryerson University, where he earned a bachelor's degree in Journalism. In his teens and early 20s, he hosted It's Up To You, a community channel program on Maclean-Hunter Cable Television about music. At Ryerson he was station manager at campus station CKLN-FM and entertainment editor at The Eyeopener newspaper.

Career
He started at The Canadian Press as a general assignment reporter in its Toronto bureau in 1980, then moved to Ottawa in 1981, where he held roles as a parliamentary reporter, a beat specialist in communications and transportation, and a columnist on fitness. He moved back to Toronto in 1984 as CP's reporter on broadcasting, then moved into management in 1986 as lifestyles editor. He returned to Ottawa in 1987 as the bureau's news editor, then was recruited in 1989 to the Canadian Broadcasting Corporation as a host on CBC Newsworld at its launch. He returned to CP in 1991 as the Ottawa bureau chief and continued as a weekly CBC Newsworld host, holding both roles until 1995. He commuted to Toronto as the CP General News editor in Toronto in 1995, then left CP to join Southam News in Ottawa as its editor-in-chief and general manager.

He was recruited by Southam to move to Hamilton as editor-in-chief of the Hamilton Spectator from 1997 until 1998. While at the Spectator, he helped prototype a national newspaper that would later be called the National Post, and he was hired as its founding executive editor. He then returned to the Spectator in 1999 to serve as editor and associate publisher.

He was recruited in 2010 to be ombudsman for the Canadian Broadcasting Corporation. He was subsequently executive director of the Organization of News Ombudsmen.

Mayoral campaign
In July 2014, he was chosen by the Non-Partisan Association, a municipal political party in Vancouver, to be the party's nominee for Mayor of Vancouver in the November 15, 2014 municipal election. LaPointe received 40% of the vote (73,443 votes), coming in second behind incumbent mayor Gregor Robertson who received 46%.

On election night following his defeat, LaPointe thought he might put politics "in the rear view mirror.  He added: "I recognize it comes with a physical, emotional toll, and I’m not sure I want to experience that any time soon." In November 2017, he was quoted as saying he was exploring another run for the mayoralty. He later determined not to run.

Current activities
LaPointe has been an adjunct professor and executive-in-residence at the University of British Columbia Graduate School of Journalism since 2004. He teaches ethics and leadership.

References

1957 births
Canadian television news anchors
Canadian publishers (people)
Journalists from British Columbia
Journalists from Toronto
Living people
Politicians from Toronto
Politicians from Vancouver